Tomás Gomensoro is a village (pueblo) in the Artigas Department of northern Uruguay.

Geography
The railroad track Salto - Bella Unión passes through the village.

History
Its earlier name was "Zanja Honda" and it was declared as "Pueblo" by the Act of Ley 3.455 on 3 May 1909. The village was then renamed after the acting President of Uruguay Tomás Gomensoro Albín.

Population
In 2011, Tomás Gomensoro had a population of 2,659.
 
Source: Instituto Nacional de Estadística de Uruguay

See also
Tomás Gomensoro Albín#Town in Artigas Department named after Gomensoro

References

External links
Satellite map at Maplandia.com
INE map of Tomás Gomensoro

Populated places in the Artigas Department